The Petit Jardin Formation is a geologic formation in Newfoundland and Labrador. It preserves fossils dating back to the Cambrian period.

See also

 List of fossiliferous stratigraphic units in Newfoundland and Labrador

References
 

Cambrian Newfoundland and Labrador
Cambrian southern paleotemperate deposits